Ensar Arifović (born July 21, 1980 in Sarajevo) is a Bosnian-Herzegovinian retired footballer striker who last played for Flota Świnoujście.

Club career
In February 2010, he joined Flota Świnoujście.

In July 2011, he moved to Arka Gdynia on a one-year contract.

References

External links
  
 Ensar Arifović at jagiellonia.neostrada.pl

1980 births
Living people
Footballers from Sarajevo
Association football forwards
Bosnia and Herzegovina footballers
FC Metz players
Neuchâtel Xamax FCS players
FK Sarajevo players
Dibba Al-Hisn Sports Club players
FK Željezničar Sarajevo players
Polonia Warsaw players
ŁKS Łódź players
Jagiellonia Białystok players
Górnik Zabrze players
Flota Świnoujście players
Arka Gdynia players
Swiss Super League players
Premier League of Bosnia and Herzegovina players
UAE First Division League players
Ekstraklasa players
I liga players
Bosnia and Herzegovina expatriate footballers
Expatriate footballers in Switzerland
Bosnia and Herzegovina expatriate sportspeople in Switzerland
Expatriate footballers in the United Arab Emirates
Bosnia and Herzegovina expatriate sportspeople in the United Arab Emirates
Expatriate footballers in Poland
Bosnia and Herzegovina expatriate sportspeople in Poland